The New Aesthetics is an art movement that stresses the material and physical processes in the making of visual art. It is unrelated to "The New Aesthetic" as coined by James Bridle.

Origins

The origin of the New Aesthetics lies in an art summer school held in Irsee, southern Germany, in 2007 and the joint class held there by the English artist Clive Head and the Anglo-Cypriot writer and art theorist Michael Paraskos. Head and Paraskos had previously taught together at the University of Hull but had both left academic teaching in 2000 and gone partly their separate ways. The reunion in Irsee resulted in a small pamphlet being published, The Aphorisms of Irsee in which they set out a series of seventy-five aphoristic sayings on the nature of art. Although a number of the sayings are deliberately comic, such as Beware the Swiss bearing sausages, the majority of them assert what the authors believed to be the essential elements of artistic practise. Some of these are also deliberately provocative, such as aphorism 38: Performance is not art: it moves too much and so adds to the flux. Art is always a longed for stasis, which can be set alongside aphorism 37: True art fixes the flux of chaos. That is how we cope with chaos, and that is the purpose of art.

Other aphorisms give a clue to the content of the class taught at Irsee. Aphorism 47 stated: One should choose whether to make tables or bake cakes, and not be a carpenter of cakes or a baker of tables. This seems to link to a fable-like story published by Paraskos in 2008 in which a carpenter thinks he is a baker because he can make tables. In introducing the story Paraskos states that it was written in 2007 just prior to the summer school in Irsee whilst he was teaching on another art summer school at the Cyprus College of Art. In the same introduction he says it was 'performed' by him whilst in Irsee. "The Aphorisms of Irsee" is subtitled 'Part One of the New Aesthetics' and this appears to the first reference to the term.

Michael Paraskos and the Table Top Schools of Art

Although some of the ideas behind the New Aesthetics might arguably be seen in the paintings of Clive Head, amongst others, prior to the appearance of publications on it, as a definable concept the New Aesthetics took a major leap forward in the publication of Paraskos's booklet The Table Top Schools of Art again in 2008. This was subtitled 'Part Two of the New Aesthetics', and in it Paraskos set out a general opposition to Conceptualism in art and argued for the creation of a 'new aesthetics' in which the physical act of the artist engaging with the material world, the artist making a material response to that engagement with the materials of art, and finally allowing the viewer to engage with that response through interaction with the materiality of the art object are the key factors. In this, Paraskos suggested, centuries of 'wrong-headed' pontificating about art by philosophers, literary critics and countless other individuals who do not know about the importance of physicality in making art, or who despise that physicality, or who come from backgrounds such as philosophy or literary criticism in which they do not deal with material objects, is swept away. In its place, Paraskos claims, is a philosophy of art that is based on the practical experience of making art that for the first time in history serves the needs of artists. In this can be seen the basis of an objection to Conceptualism as conceptualists are not only rooted in a non-material philosophical tradition, but place the immaterial idea above the material artefact.

Is Your Artwork Really Necessary?

The third published statement on the New Aesthetics came in 2009 in the form of Paraskos's collected journalistic writings on art, entitled Is Your Artwork Really Necessary? Subtitled as 'Part Three of the New Aesthetics', the articles deal with an array of contemporary and historic art, as well as a number of political issues, making it less clear cut as a statement on what the New Aesthetics means. Nonetheless in the introduction and number of the articles a reassertion of the importance of material engagement in art come to the fore. This is particularly true in the article on Clive Head, in which Paraskos asserts that photography is problematic in terms of art due to its immateriality and the way the camera comes between the artist and direct physical engagement with reality. It is also apparent in the articles on Hughie O'Donoghue and Van Dyck, in each of which the critical examination is centred firmly on the materiality of the paintings and not their narrative (or conceptual) meanings. Perhaps the most striking thing about the book, however, is in the introduction where the undoubtedly aggressive stance towards immaterial art forms, like Conceptualism, which appeared in The Table Top Schools of Art, is maintained. Paraskos goes so far as to call for an 'artistic revolution'.

Clive Head

Although not labelled as part of the New Aesthetics, both the paintings and writings of Clive Head are embodiments of this philosophy. In particular Head's introduction to John Russell Taylor's book Exactitude emphasises the need for realist painters to move away from reliance on the camera and engage with the physical world around them directly. Head extends this to include non-realist painters, an attitude that reflects Paraskos's embrace of both a realist painter like Head and an abstract one like O'Donoghue into the New Aesthetic camp. For both Paraskos and Head this is the only way that art can legitimately engage in the contemporary world - their word for this is 'actuality' - as to physically do something here and now is to engage with the here and now. This is contrasted with illustrating past philosophical or critical concepts, or past imagery such as the photograph. This is partly dealt with in Paraskos's review of art exhibitions by Bruce McLean, Hughie O'Donoghue and Subodh Gupta for the London edition of the Epoch Times, calling this engagement with actuality the 'Urgency of Now'.

Alan Pocaro

Alan Pocaro's formal involvement in the New Aesthetics as a movement began in 2010 through correspondence with Paraskos and was cemented through a joint teaching session Paraskos and Pocaro held in early 2011, via internet video link, of students at Miami University. In addition to teaching at the Art Academy of Cincinnati, Pocaro had already been writing articles for the Cincinnati-based art magazine AEQAI, in which he developed a parallel philosophy of art to that proposed by Paraskos and Head. This is evident in several of his writings for AEQAI, including his claim that the discourse of art is not a free for all in which anything goes, but as Paraskos suggests in his book Regeneration, a specific activity that has parameters.

Robert Neffson

Robert Neffson is an American painter who has had a long correspondence with Clive Head about the role of realism in contemporary art. Among other subjects, their letters focus on the creative process and many of the nascent concepts of the New Aesthetic.  A portion of these exchanges were published in "Clive Head and Robert Neffson," (London: Marlborough Fine Art, 2007). He has also discussed ideas on the New Aesthetic with Michael Paraskos. Neffson's work shows evidence of many of these principles, in particular his personal engagement with the spaces he depicts and his expressive perspective. His paintings seem to take reality and extrapolate elements to create a specific emotional response from the viewer.

References 

Contemporary art movements